Thomas Smith Cummings (12 September 1928 – 12 July 2009) was an English football player and manager.

Cummings was born in Sunderland, County Durham and started his football career at Hylton Colliery Juniors. Such was his quality as a centre-half he was invited to Strasbourg in 1947 to represent Great Britain in a junior international tournament. In the same year he signed a professional contract with Burnley, also opting to continue his apprenticeship as a mining engineer.

Cummings made his league debut for Burnley in December 1948. He also played for England B three times. He played in the 1959–60 championship winning season and in the 1962 FA Cup Final, and in all made 479 appearances for the Clarets, standing fifth in their all-time list of Football League appearances with 434. He played his last game for the club nearly 14 years after making his debut.

In March 1963 he was appointed player-manager of Mansfield Town leading them to promotion from Division Four at the end of the season. He was appointed Aston Villa manager in the summer of 1967 but sacked in November 1968.

After retiring from football he went on to becoming a licensee and ran pubs in and around Burnley, including the Shooters Arms in Nelson.

Honours
 Burnley
 Football League First Division champions: 1959–60
 FA Cup runner-up: 1962

References

External links
Tommy Cummings profile at Clarets Mad

Tommy Cummings Tribute at Much Loved Memorial website, created by his Granddaughter.

1928 births
2009 deaths
Footballers from Sunderland
English footballers
Association football central defenders
Burnley F.C. players
Mansfield Town F.C. players
English football managers
Mansfield Town F.C. managers
Aston Villa F.C. managers
English Football League players
English Football League representative players
FA Cup Final players